Daniel Simiu Ebenyo (born 18 September 1995) is a Kenyan middle-distance and long-distance runner.

Brought up in Baragoi, Samburu County, having lost his father early in life to cattle rustling, he was raised by his mother and later, grandmother. He has said that it was while at Aiyam Day secondary school a 24 km trek to the learning institution and back home would eventually make him an athlete as walking to school early in the morning and back in the evening was the most dangerous time to do the journey as they crossed bandits’ battle grounds along the narrow paths to the school and even though he would set off at 5.30am for an 8am start at school, would sometimes be forced to take an even longer route. He now trains in Iten in the Rift Valley.

He finished in second place at the 2019 Kenya national World championships trials. However, he was unable to compete as he failed to meet some of the Athletes Integrity Unit (AIU) doping requirements. Simiyu did the in-competition test several times, but did not meet the required three out-of- competition tests that are mandatory for all athletes and include both urine and blood must include at least one Athlete Biological Passport (ABP) test and one Erythropoietin (Epo) test. Simiyu blamed Athletics Kenya for the debacle, claiming the federation did not inform him of the regulations before he signed up for the trials. He was so disappointed he contemplated quitting the track and venturing into road racing full time and he won the Safaricom Kisii 10 km road race in a time of 29:16.71 as well as winning the 10 km race at the Nairobi Marathon in an event record time of 28:23.

He started the 2021 season with a victory after winning the elite-only San Silvestre Vallecana 10 km in Spain on the 3rd of January.

He earned a spot on the Kenyan team for the 2020 Summer Games in the 5000m after finishing in the top 2 at the Kenyan Olympic trials after running a personal best 13:05.05. behind Nicholas Kimeli, and was confirmed on the Kenyan team.

References

1995 births
Living people
People from Samburu County
Kenyan male middle-distance runners
Kenyan male long-distance runners
Athletes (track and field) at the 2020 Summer Olympics
Olympic athletes of Kenya
20th-century Kenyan people
21st-century Kenyan people
Athletes (track and field) at the 2022 Commonwealth Games
Commonwealth Games silver medallists for Kenya
Commonwealth Games medallists in athletics
Medallists at the 2022 Commonwealth Games